Neil Nitin Mukesh Chand Mathur (born 15 January 1982) is an Indian actor, producer and writer who mainly works in Bollywood films . Born to singer Nitin Mukesh and grandson of Mukesh, he debuted as a child artist in Vijay (1988) and Jaisi Karni Waisi Bharnii (1989). As an adult, he played the title role in Johnny Gaddaar (2007) and has since starred in the hits New York (2009), Kaththi (2014), Prem Ratan Dhan Payo (2015), Golmaal Again (2017), and Saaho (2019). His Tamil debut was Kaththi (2014) and Telugu debut was Kavacham (2018).

Early life and background 
Mukesh was born as Neil Nitin Mukesh Chand Mathur on 15 January 1982 in Mumbai, Maharashtra. His father is Bollywood playback singer Nitin Mukesh, son of veteran singer Mukesh. His paternal grandmother was a Gujarati Shrimali Brahmin while his paternal grandfather was a Mathur Kayastha from Delhi. He was named by Lata Mangeshkar after the American astronaut Neil Armstrong. As a child, he appeared in Vijay (1988) and Jaisi Karni Waisi Bharnii (1989) as the younger versions of Rishi Kapoor and Govinda respectively.

Mukesh was educated at HR College in Mumbai, where he graduated with a bachelor's degree in commerce at his father's insistence. He then decided to pursue a career in acting, despite being born into a family of singers. In an interview with The Times of India, the actor said "singing is my hobby, but acting is my passion. A passion that even my grand-dad harboured. So, while my father continued his legacy and became a singer, I pursued his other passion. I am living his dream". Neil trained at a four-month workshop at the Kishore Namit Kapoor Acting Institute, and received training from actor Anupam Kher.

2007–10: Debut and breakthrough 
Mukesh made his debut in Sriram Raghavan's 2007 thriller Johnny Gaddaar. His portrayal of a crook received positive reviews from critics and earned him a nomination for the Filmfare Award for Best Male Debut. Taran Adarsh of Bollywood Hungama described Neil as a "complete natural": "The youngster carries off the part with dexterity. There's just one word to describe his performance – superb!" However, despite critical acclaim, the film failed to do well at the box office.

His first 2009 film was the science-fiction thriller Aa Dekhen Zara. Co-starring with Bipasha Basu, he played a struggling photographer who inherits a camera (whose photos predict the future) from his scientist grandfather. The film was a critical and commercial failure. His performance received mixed reviews from critics; while Nikhat Kazmi described him as charming and effortless, Raja Sen of Rediff.com said he "seems to have cleverly picked another character that doesn't require him to act much beyond the fish-out-of-water routine".

His major breakthrough came with Kabir Khan's drama thriller New York with John Abraham, Katrina Kaif and Irrfan Khan. Exploring the aftermath of the 9/11, the film was a critical and commercial success, earning over  worldwide. His performance was praised by critics, earning him a nomination for the Filmfare Award for Best Supporting Actor. Subhash K Jha wrote: "Neil as the sophomore with stars and stripes in his eyes is fully convincing credible and supportive of the two central performances."

His final film of the year was Madhur Bhandarkar's Jail, a drama revolving around the cruel reality faced by prisoners in Indian jails. The film's aesthetically shot nude scene (demonstrating the torture Mukesh's character received in jail) and a masturbation scene sparked controversy; as a result, the latter scene was shortened. Mukesh remarked, "My nude or masturbation scenes are not for titillation. It's a very practical need in the script. My character is in jail without sex for 2-1/2 years. What does he do? He naturally seeks pleasure by himself." A commercial failure, the film and his performance were praised by critics. Taran Adarsh wrote: "Not only does Neil Nitin Mukesh deliver his finest performance to date, but the performance would easily rank amongst the finest this year. He conveys the pathos and helplessness that this character demands with amazing understanding. He deserves all praise for his extra-ordinary portrayal."

In 2010, Mukesh featured in Pradeep Sarkar's action drama Lafangey Parindey with Deepika Padukone. While the film received mixed reviews, his portrayal of a fighter was appreciated by critics. According to Sify's Sonia Chopra, Neil's "underplayed acting style complements the character's sketch perfectly". Blessy Chettiar of Daily News and Analysis noted: "He looks great in every frame and carries off [the character's] rugged demeanour with panache." Neil then starred in Sudhir Mishra's dramatic thriller Tera Kya Hoga Johnny.

He has also been a brand ambassador to one of the leading clothing brands of the country, Oxemberg, in April 2010.

2011–present: Recent work 
The following year Mukesh starred in Vishal Bhardwaj's 7 Khoon Maaf, a black comedy-drama (based on Ruskin Bond's short story Susanna's Seven Husbands) featuring Priyanka Chopra as a woman who murders her seven husbands in an unending quest for love. The actor was cast as Chopra's first husband, Major Edwin Rodriques, an arrogant, jealous and possessive army officer who lost a leg in Punjab's Operation Blue Star in 1984. The film premiered at the 61st Berlin Film Festival; it was a commercial failure, receiving mixed reviews from critics, but Mukesh's performance was praised. Nikhat Kazmi wrote that he "excelled as the brute."

In 2012, Mukesh starred in Abbas–Mustan's Players as part of an ensemble cast including Abhishek Bachchan, Sonam Kapoor, Bipasha Basu and Bobby Deol. The film was a remake of the 2003 Hollywood heist thriller The Italian Job; it was also a commercial failure, receiving mixed to negative reviews from critics (as did Mukesh's performance). Subhash K Jha said he "brings a mean menacing tone to the villainy." And according to Rediff.com's Sukanya Verma, Mukesh "mistakes sinister for superficial, resulting in a truly phony performance."

In 2013, Mukesh worked in three films, though all were commercially unsuccessful. His first release was Bejoy Nambiar's action-drama David, in which he played a gangster whose boss controls the Asian community in 1970's London. The actor said his character's dual personality appealed to him: "Here was this hardcore, extremely violent gangster and on the other hand, my director wanted me to show the emotional and romantic side to him too." The film received mixed reviews, but Mukesh's performance was critically acclaimed. Writing for The Times of India, Madhureeta Mukherjee described it as "restrained and powerful" and CNN-IBN's Rajeev Masand said that Mukesh is "nicely understated".

He next appeared opposite Sonal Chauhan in Eros International's horror film 3G. Filmed in Fiji, the film told the story of how the duo face supernatural occurrences when they buy a 3G-enabled phone. The film was not well received by critics. In a review for Rediff.com, Ankur Pathak said that Mukesh is "aggressively over the top" and added that his "body language is consistently uncomfortable." He also appeared in Susi Ganeshan's crime thriller Shortcut Romeo with Ameesha Patel and Puja Gupta. The picture ran into trouble when it got a limited release by its producers, and emerged as a major commercial failure. On his performance, Madhureeta Mukherjee of The Times of India said: "Neil performs well as always, he looks good (he needs to tone down his physicality for such roles) and proves that actors like him need better scripts to justify their true potential."

Mukesh has completed work on two films – Prerna Wadhwan's romantic drama Ishqeria, which will see him star opposite Richa Chadda, and Manish Vatsalya's Dussehra, where Mukesh will feature as an encounter specialist with Tena Desae. He debuted in Tamil cinema with AR Murugadoss's Kaththi.  He also acted in Sooraj R. Barjatya's 2015 family drama Prem Ratan Dhan Payo with Salman Khan and Sonam Kapoor. He also made a guest appearance in Wazir.

In November 2018, he turned producer and started filming Bypass Road, a thriller-drama film directed by his brother Naman Nitin Mukesh and written by himself. The film is scheduled to be released on 1 November 2019.

In 2019, he appeared in Saaho, a multilingual film directed by Sujeeth, playing an antagonist Jai aka Ashok Chakravarty.

Personal life 
In 2017, Mukesh married Rukmini Sahay in a traditional Hindu wedding arranged by the familial elders.

In April 2018, Neil Nitin Mukesh announced via Instagram that the couple were expecting their first child. A daughter, Nurvi Neil Mukesh, was born on 20 September 2018.

Other ventures

Social activism 
In 2009, Mukesh started an NGO to support and help needy women by providing them with food, shelter and vocational training to support themselves. The philanthropic project was named for his grandmother, Saral Devi Mathur. The actor said: "I have read about women getting oppressed, exploited by men and other family members. They get sold like commodities and are driven into prostitution. I'm always pained to hear all this and at the back of my mind I had thought that I would start an organisation to support such women." In 2012, he joined with Volkswagen in support of an environmental campaign called "Think Blue", an initiative increasing awareness of water scarcity and other pressing ecological issues.

Award ceremony participation 
Mukesh participated in the Hiru Golden Film Awards 2016 in Sri Lanka as a special guest, along with Bollywood actors such as Sunil Shetty, Jackie Shroff, and actresses Sridevi, Madhuri Dixit and Karishma Kapoor.

Filmography

Awards and nominations

See also 

 List of Indian film actors

References

External links 
 
 

Indian male film actors
21st-century Indian male actors
Living people
Gujarati people
1982 births
Male actors in Hindi cinema
Male actors from Mumbai
Indian male child actors
Zee Cine Awards Telugu winners